Mariette in Ecstasy is a 1991 fiction novel written by Ron Hansen. it is set in a cloister in New York in 1906. It is defined as a "wonderful and strange novel" and it is "beautifully described".

In 1992 it received the Barnes and Noble Discover Award, the Commonwealth Club of California Gold Medal in Fiction and the Bay Area Book Reviewers Association 1992 Award in Fiction.

In 1996 it was adapted into a film but it was never released because the production company went bankrupt. In 2009, it was adapted for the stage and produced at Lifeline Theatre in Chicago. In 2019 the film was shown for the first time at the Camerimage International Film Festival by director John Bailey, during a retrospective of his career.

References

1991 American novels
Catholic novels
American novels adapted into plays
American novels adapted into films